Lake Placid is a 1999 American comedy horror film written by David E. Kelley and directed by Steve Miner. It is the first installment in the Lake Placid film series and stars Bill Pullman, Bridget Fonda, Oliver Platt, Brendan Gleeson, Betty White, Meredith Salenger, and Mariska Hargitay. In the film, a giant, 30-foot-long monstrous saltwater crocodile terrorizes the fictional location of Black Lake, Maine, the film also follows a dysfunctional group who attempt to capture or kill the beast.

Lake Placid was produced by Fox 2000 Pictures and Stan Winston Studios (which did the special effects for the creatures) and principal photography was shot in British Columbia, Canada. The film was distributed by 20th Century Fox and released in theatres in the United States on July 16, 1999, and in the United Kingdom on March 31, 2000. It grossed $56.9 million worldwide and was followed by five low-budget made-for-television sequels, starting with Lake Placid 2 in 2007.

Plot 

In Aroostook County, Maine, Fish and Game officer Walt Lawson is scuba diving in Black Lake when he is suddenly attacked and bitten in half by an unknown creature.

The next day, Sheriff Hank Keough, Fish and Game officer Jack Wells, and American Museum of Natural History paleontologist Kelly Scott go to the lake to investigate the incident with mythology professor and crocodile enthusiast Hector Cyr joining them. After Kelly and Hank's canoe is flipped over, they discover a severed human toe and a moose head. Meanwhile, Hank's deputy, Burke, has his head bitten off when his boat is attacked while Wells and Cyr are diving.

After finding Burke's severed head, Jack, Kelly, and Hank witness Delores Bickerman, an elderly hermit living near the lake, feeding a blindfolded dairy cow to the giant crocodile. She reveals that she has been feeding the reptile for years after the crocodile followed her husband Bernie home and eventually killed him two years ago when he got between the croc and a runaway horse. Afterwards, she was placed under house arrest for initially lying to the police.

Hector decides to take Deputy Sharon Gare on a trip in his helicopter and unexpectedly lands it in the crocodile's territory. While he is scuba diving, he is confronted by the creature, but he and Gare escape after distracting it with an inflatable raft. Later, Jack and Hank plan to allow Florida Fish and Game to kill the crocodile when they arrive, but Hector suggests instead that he should lure it out of the water and tranquilize it into unconsciousness. Jack reluctantly accepts the proposal and they use one of Bickerman's cattle, dangled from the helicopter, as bait.

After a few hours, the crocodile soon appears and rears up as it lunges at its prey. Hector pulls up and loses the animal, but crashes the helicopter into the lake. The crocodile comes on land and begins to pursue Jack, Kelly, and the group. Kelly is knocked into the lake by the crocodile's tail, but she makes it into the helicopter in time. The crocodile catches up to Kelly and prepares to make its move, but is itself trapped in the helicopter. Jack grabs a gun and shoots it, but the firearm turns out to be a tranquilizer rifle. As Hector comes out of the water, another crocodile attacks and bites him, but Hank blows it up with his grenade launcher. Soon after, Florida Fish and Game officers arrive, where they load the neutralized crocodile onto a truck and take it to Portland, Maine to figure out what to do with it.

One week later, Bickerman is shown feeding bread crumbs to many baby crocodiles, revealing the two adults were actually a mating pair. The surviving adult crocodile is later seen tied to the back of a flatbed trailer, speeding down a road somewhere.

Cast 

 Bill Pullman as Jack Wells
 Bridget Fonda as Kelly Scott
 Oliver Platt as Hector Cyr
 Brendan Gleeson as Sheriff Hank Keough
 Betty White as Mrs. Delores Bickerman
 Meredith Salenger as Deputy Sharon Gare
 David Lewis as Walt Lawson
 Tim Dixon as Stephen Daniels
 Natassia Malthe as Janine
 Mariska Hargitay as Myra Okubo
 Jed Rees as Deputy Burke
 Richard Leacock as Deputy Stevens
 Jake T. Roberts as Officer Coulson
 Ty Olsson as State Trooper
 Adam Arkin as Kevin (uncredited)
 Steve Miner as Airplane Pilot

Production 
Lake Placid was produced by Fox 2000 Pictures, Phoenix Pictures, and Rocking Chair Productions.

Some of the film's scenes were shot in Vancouver and Surrey, British Columbia. Three different lakes in British Columbia stood in for the fictional "Black Lake": Shawnigan Lake, Buntzen Lake and Hayward Lake.

Soundtrack 

The soundtrack for the film was composed and conducted by John Ottman, and released by Varèse Sarabande.

 Track listing
 Main Title (2:25)
 Hector's Here (1:11)
 Close Call (3:59)
 Udder Preparations (4:02)
 Love Games (2:25)
 Reluctant Passengers (1:46)
 Morgue / Scary Beaver (4:11)
 Scouting (2:22)
 Here He Comes! (4:57)
 Making a Move /Jack (2:11)
 Swimming With Croc (3:36)
 Hector's Mind (2:48)
 Weird Things / Dinner Time (2:51)
 Ground Rules (1:43)
 Trapping Croc / Resolution (5:30)
 The Lake / Hitching a Ride (1:03)

Reception 
On review aggregator website Rotten Tomatoes, the film has an approval rating of 47% based on 95 reviews, with an average rating of 5.10/10. The site's critics consensus reads, "Betty White's delightful supporting turn may be worth the price of admission alone, but Lake Placid is swamped by a smarmy script and inability to deliver on the creature feature mayhem". On Metacritic, the film has a weighted average score of 34 out of 100, based on 25 critics, indicating "generally unfavorable reviews". Audiences polled by CinemaScore gave the film an average grade of "C" on an A+ to F scale.

Roger Ebert of the Chicago Sun-Times gave the film one out of four stars, describing it as "completely wrong-headed from beginning to end". He put it on his list of the 10 Worst Films of the Year. Andrew Collins of Empire gave the film four out of five stars, writing that "you can enjoy Placid as a straightforward camping-holiday nightmare, or as a sly, ironic take on the same. It works deliciously as both".

See also 
 List of killer crocodile films

References

External links 

 
 
 
 

1999 films
1999 horror films
1990s comedy horror films
American comedy horror films
American natural horror films
1990s English-language films
Films about crocodilians
Films directed by Steve Miner
Films scored by John Ottman
Films set in 1999
Films set in Maine
Films shot in Vancouver
Films shot in Maine
Giant monster films
Lake Placid (film series)
Phoenix Pictures films
20th Century Fox films
1999 comedy films
1990s American films